Lila Álvarez Garcia (26 February 1915 – 28 December 1999) was an Ecuadorian pianist, choir director, and musical art teacher. Graduating from the National Conservatory of Music, she moved to Guayaquil to work and teach.

Work 

 Theory and Piano teachings at the Antonio Neumane National Conservatory of Music in Buenos Aires.
 Directing choral groups in local secondary schools.
 House of Ecuadorian Culture 
 The core of Guayas; musical association Ángelo Negri
 Patronato Musical de Bellas Artes
 National union of musicians Guayaquil 
 The board of directors of the Symphony Orchestra of Guayaquil
 Ran a didactic program on Channel 2 (Ecuavisa) 
 Writing for El Telégrafo and EL UNIVERSO

References 

1915 births
1999 deaths
People from Quito
20th-century Ecuadorian women
Hispanic and Latino American musicians